Acaroceratidae is family of Upper Cambrian (Trempealeauan) nautiloid cephalopods included in the Ellesmerocerida that contains two known genera, Acaroceras and Weishanuceras, both found in northern China.

Acaroceratidae represent some of the earliest Ellesmeroderida, which have their origin in the Plectronoceratidae, either in Plectronoceras or some related genus.  Acaroceras is known from the lower and middle Trempealeauan, upper Yenchou and  overlying Wanwankou members of the Fengshan Formation.  Weishanuceras is so far limited to the Wanwankou.

The Acaroceratidae are characterized by small, slightly  expanded, laterally compressed  shells with a slight downward,(endogastric), curvature. Siphuncles are tubular, located along the ventral margin; composed of straight segments.

In general conformation Acaroceras and Weishanuceras are rather similar, but  differ in the details of the siphuncle. Acaroceras, the earlier of the two, has a siphuncle composed of short straight septal necks and thin straight connecting rings, and is empty of internal calcareous  deposits. Rather thin, slightly concave diaphragms are present in the early, adapical, portion. Weishanuceras, which came later, also has short straight septal necks, but connecting rings are moderately thick as well as straight, and the siphuncle contains internal, ring-like deposits.

Neither of the Acaroceratidae appears to have left any descendants. Early Acaroceras, from the upper Yenchou, are contemporary with later Plectronoceras,  early Paraplectronoceras,  Hunyuanoceras, and a few  others.  Later Acaroceras and Weishanuceras are part of the entire suite of early cephalopods that lived during the Late Cambrian.  Acaroceras lends its name to the Acaroceras-Sinoceremoceras Zone which is contained by the Wanwankou member of the Fengshan Formation.

References

 Chen Jun-yuan and Curt Teichert, 1983.  Cambrian Cephalopods. Geology V.11, p 647-650, Nov 1983
 Chen Jun-yuan Zou Xi-ping & Chen Ting-en, 1979   Late Cambrian Ellesmerocerida (Cephalopoda) of North China. Acta Paleontologica Sinica 1979-02

Prehistoric nautiloid families
Cambrian first appearances
Cambrian extinctions
Ellesmerocerida